The Chief Electoral Officer of Canada is the person responsible for the administration of elections, referendums and other aspects of the electoral system in Canada. The position was established in 1920 under the Dominion Elections Act to be the chief executive of the independent agency now known as Elections Canada.

The chief electoral officer is assisted in carrying out their mandate by the assistant chief electoral officer and the broadcasting arbitrator who ensures that the provisions of the Canada Elections Act and the Canada Referendum Act are carried out, and the Commissioner of Canada Elections who enforces the act.

Stéphane Perrault was appointed chief electoral officer for Elections Canada on June 8, 2018, after having served as acting chief electoral officer from December 2016 to June 2018. Perrault is scheduled to hold this position for a 10-year term.

List of Chief Electoral Officers of Canada
 Oliver Mowat Biggar (1920–1927)
 Jules Castonguay (1927–1949)
 Nelson Jules Castonguay (1949–1966)
 Jean-Marc Hamel (1966–1990)
 Jean-Pierre Kingsley (1990–2007)
 Marc Mayrand (2007–2016)
 Stéphane Perrault Acting (2016-2018) (2018-)

References

External links
 Elections Canada On-Line - Chief Electoral Officer of Canada

 
Officers of the Parliament of Canada